Moana Sands Conservation Park is a protected area located in the suburb of Moana in South Australia about  south of Adelaide. It was proclaimed under the National Parks and Wildlife Act 1972 in 1985 for the purpose of conserving a ‘significant Aboriginal cultural heritage site' associated with the Kaurna people.’ A statement of significance published after the park's dedication in 1985 advises: ‘prehistoric significance (aboriginal flakes, implements, evidence of burials)’ and ‘unusual red sands.’ The conservation park is classified as an IUCN Category III protected area.

See also
 List of protected areas in Adelaide

References

External links
Moana Sands Conservation Park official webpage
Moana Sands Conservation Park webpage on protected planet

Conservation parks of South Australia
Protected areas in Adelaide
Protected areas established in 1985
1985 establishments in Australia